In Nuevo León the President of the Superior Court of Justice is the presiding magistrate of the State's Court.

Presidents of the Superior Court of Justice of Nuevo León are elected for a term of 2 years with no possibility of reelection.  In the past, President of the Court were elected every year with the possibility of being reelected.

Recent Presidents

 Nicolas Díaz Obregón. ?-1996
 María Teresa Herrera Tello. 1996-1999
 Enrique Guzmán Benavides. 1999-2001
 Adolfo Guerrero Gutiérrez. 2001-2003
 Genaro Muñoz Muñoz. 2003-2005
Jorge Luis Mancillas. 2005–2007
Gustavo Adolfo Guerrero Gutiérrez. 2007-2009
Graciela Buchanan Ortega. 2011-2013
Gustavo Adolfo Guerrero Gutiérrez. 2013-2015
 Carlos Emilio Arenas Bátiz. 2015-presente.

Government of Nuevo León
Mexican judges